Jean-Paul Baréty (10 March 1928 – 3 November 2018) was a French lawyer and politician. He served as a member of the National Assembly from 1994 to 1997, representing Alpes-Maritimes.

Biography
After an early career as a lawyer, Baréty entered politics and joined the Rally for the Republic (RPR). He was elected Mayor of Nice in 1993 and served until 1995. He was also elected as a deputy in the 2nd electoral district of Alpes-Maritimes, replacing Christian Estrosi. He served until 1997.

He was also the president of Acadèmia Nissarda from 1978 until his death.

Baréty was awarded as a Knight of the Legion of Honour in 1993.

References

1928 births
2018 deaths
Chevaliers of the Légion d'honneur
Deputies of the 10th National Assembly of the French Fifth Republic
20th-century French lawyers
Mayors of Nice
People from Nice
Politicians from Provence-Alpes-Côte d'Azur
Rally for the Republic politicians